The Peugeot J7 is a small front wheel drive van produced from 1965 until 1980 with a total production of 336,220 vehicles. In 1981 the J7 was succeeded by a revised version called J9.

The J7 was available in a number of versions including panel van, minibus, pick up and pick up with cab with a gross payload of either  or  depending on version. The J7 was originally launched with a choice of 4-cylinder petrol (1468 cc) or diesel (1816 cc) engines.    The J7 was not sold in the United Kingdom, but various private imports have occurred over the years.

References

External links

J7
Front-wheel-drive vehicles
Vans
Vehicles introduced in 1965